Celes Kobayashi (セレス小林, born Shoji Kobayashi, February 27, 1973) is a former professional boxer from Ibaraki, Japan. He is a former WBA Super flyweight champion. He got his ring name, "Celes", from a company he used to work for. He lives in Chiba, Japan, with his wife and daughter.

Biography
Kobayashi made his debut in April 1992 in the bantamweight division, losing by 4th-round decision. He dropped down two weight classes to challenge the Japanese flyweight title in 1997, but sustained an injury in the 3rd round, and was unable to capture the title. He challenged the title again in April 1998, losing by 10-round decision, but finally won the title in September of the same year, winning the decision. He defended the title four times from 1998 to 2000.

In August 2000, Kobayashi made his first attempt at the world title against Malcolm Tunacao for the WBC Flyweight title. The fight was a draw, and the champion, Tunacao, retained the title. Kobayashi made his second try for the world title in March 2001, challenging Leo Gamez for the WBA Super flyweight title. He won by TKO in the 10th round, having dominated Gamez for the entire fight.

Kobayashi made his first defense in September 2001, winning by split decision. He fought Alexander Muñoz (undefeated in 21 fights, all won by KO) in March 2002, for his second defense, and lost by TKO in the 8th round to lose his title.

After his loss to Munoz, Kobayashi declined an offer to challenge Masamori Tokuyama for the WBC Super flyweight title, and retired from boxing.

Post retirement
Kobayashi worked briefly as a trainer for his former gym before creating the "Celes Kobayashi Boxing Gym" in Chiba, Japan. He frequently appears as a commentator in Japan for boxing title matches.

See also
 List of WBA world champions
 List of super flyweight boxing champions
 List of Japanese boxing world champions
 Boxing in Japan

Sources

External links
 
 Celes boxing gym official (Japanese)

1973 births
Living people
Super-flyweight boxers
World Boxing Association champions
World super-flyweight boxing champions
World boxing champions
Japanese male boxers
Presidents of the Japan Pro Boxing Association